Aloe affinis is a species of flowering plant in the Asphodelaceae family. It is endemic to Limpopo, Gauteng, and Mpumalanga, of South Africa. It grows 200–300 mm tall excluding inflorescence, with 16-20 leaves per plant, each leaf being roughly 200 mm long x 50–100 mm wide.

References

Sources
 Pflanzenr. IV, 38: 206 1908.
 The Plant List entry
 Encyclopedia of Life entry
 JSTOR entry
 Red List of South African Plants

affinis
Flora of the Northern Provinces
Taxa named by Alwin Berger